Sealed orders refer to directives presented to the commanding officer of a ship or squadron that are sealed at time of receipt. Officers are required to keep the orders sealed until at sea so as to maintain operational secrecy, especially in time of war.

References

Naval warfare
Secrecy